Mahmut Bezgin (born March 1, 1986 in Gaziantep, Turkey) is a Turkish footballer, who is currently playing for Turkish side Sivasspor.

External links
 Guardian Stats Centre

1986 births
Living people
Turkish footballers
Süper Lig players
Gaziantepspor footballers
Mersin İdman Yurdu footballers
Sportspeople from Gaziantep
Association football goalkeepers
21st-century Turkish people